Kivijärvi is a rather large lake in Finland. The name Kivijärvi is rather common and there are 121 lakes with the same name. This is the biggest of them. The lake is located in the Central Finland region. It is 30th biggest lake in Finland. It is a good lake for fishing. For example, a  lake trout was caught in Kivijärvi lake in summer 2001.

References

Kymi basin
Landforms of Central Finland
Kivijärvi
Kivijärvi
Kivijärvi